You Call This Music?! Volume 2 (2002) is the second volume in a series of punk music compilations released by Southern California-based Geykido Comet Records. Its cover artwork is by NYC artist Fly.

The series title lampoons the Top-40 offerings of the "Now! That's What I Call Music" series.

Reception
OC Weekly wrote the album "has the feel of a mix tape made by an enthusiastic punk fan".

Track listing
 Intro
 East Arcadia - Focus 
 Toys That Kill - Little Bit Stranger 
 The Grand Prixx - Ballad Of Sara And Anna 
 Jag Offs - Porchcore 
 Happy Campers - Reminisce 
 Nazis from Mars - Animal Farm 2084 
 Intro5pect - Sustainable Yield 
 ESL?! - Tycho Brahe 
 Kill the Scientist - I Saw.... 
 Backside - Dear God From Me 
 As I - Revolution Calls
 Diabolical Exploits - Lies 
 Operation Cliff Clavin - A Bomb and A Plan 
 Spazz - Typical Hardcore Song #1 
 Pillbox Terror - Christine 
 Chris Dodge/Dave Witte - Whiffletree 
 The Voids - Capitalist 
 Jack Killed Jill - Everyday 
 Zero Content - An Archist 
 Peelander-Z - Rocket Gold Star 
 Libertine - Moscow 
 Pornshot - Mad Song 
 Lucid Nation - Commercial 
 Friday Knights - Again 
 Lipstick Pickups - Can't Resist That Boy 
 The Devil is Electric - The New World 
 Bikini Bumps - The Cigarette Butt Fiasco 
 Four Letter Words - Slums of Shaolin 
 Fracas - Kill Me 
 UNX - Where Cracks Appear 
 Broken Society - Jock Pit 
 3x Fast - Nothing to Do But Laugh 
 Armistice - Chain of Command 
 Subincision - Punk Chick 
 Microsurgeon - Bug Report 
 Outro

References

Punk revival albums
Geykido Comet Records
2002 compilation albums
Record label compilation albums
Punk rock compilation albums